The Ghost of Morton's Castle (German: Das Gespenst auf Mortons Schloß) is a 1922 Austrian silent film directed by Hans Homma and starring Grit Haid and Egon von Jordan.

Cast
 Grit Haid
 Egon von Jordan
 Lia Landt
 Ellinor Kersten
 Harry De Loon as Gref Ludwig Salm 
 Julius Strobl
 Ernst Ludwig
 Hermann Wail

References

Bibliography
 Paolo Caneppele & Günter Krenn. Elektrische Schatten. Filmarchiv Austria, 1999.

External links

1922 films
Austrian silent feature films
Films directed by Hans Homma
Austrian black-and-white films
Films set in castles